Mustafa Çakır (born December 15, 1986 in Sinop, Turkey) is a Turkish yacht racer competing in the Laser class.

He qualified for participation at the 2012 Summer Olympics, finishing in 39th place.

He won the Laser-Europacup 2012 held in Martigues, France.

Achievements

References

1986 births
People from Sinop, Turkey
Turkish male sailors (sport)
Living people
Olympic sailors of Turkey
Sailors at the 2012 Summer Olympics – Laser
Members of the 22nd Parliament of Turkey